Milan Lucic (born June 7, 1988) is a Canadian professional ice hockey player for the Calgary Flames of the National Hockey League (NHL). He played major junior hockey with the Vancouver Giants in the Western Hockey League (WHL) for three seasons and captured the Memorial Cup, while being named tournament MVP in 2007. He was selected 50th overall in the 2006 NHL Entry Draft and made the Boston Bruins' roster as a 19-year-old in 2007–08. Three years later, he won a Stanley Cup with the Bruins. He spent the first eight seasons of his NHL career with Boston prior to being traded to the Los Angeles Kings in June 2015. After a single season in Los Angeles, Lucic signed as a free agent with the Edmonton Oilers in July 2016, playing three seasons for the Oilers before being traded to Calgary in July 2019.

Internationally, Lucic captained the Canadian national junior team at the 2007 Super Series. He plays physically in the style of a power forward.

Early life
Lucic was born in East Vancouver to Serbian couple Dobrivoje "Dobro" Lučić and Snežana Kesa. His father, Dobro, was a longshoreman in Vancouver who immigrated to North America from his native Serbia when he was 27. His mom, Snezana, came to Vancouver when her parents moved from Serbia when she was just 2. He has a younger brother named Nikola and an older brother named Jovan. His maternal uncle, Dan Kesa, is a retired NHL right winger who played for the Vancouver Canucks, Pittsburgh Penguins, Tampa Bay Lightning and Dallas Stars.

Growing up, Lucic attended Killarney Secondary in Vancouver. He was a fan of the hometown Vancouver Canucks and has named forward Todd Bertuzzi as one of his favourite players when following the team. At age 15, Lucic was diagnosed with Scheuermann's disease, a condition that can cause the upper back to curve and has given him a hunched-over posture.

Lucic played minor hockey (VMHA) in Vancouver, but nearly quit the sport after being passed up in the 2003 WHL Bantam Draft. He was invited to play for the Coquitlam Express of the Junior A British Columbia Hockey League (BCHL), but was further demoralized when he initially failed to make the team out of rookie camp. He agreed to play, instead, for the Junior B Delta Ice Hawks, but later played his way onto the Express after five games.

Playing career

Amateur

Lucic began his junior career with the Coquitlam Express of the BCHL in 2004–05. In the same season, he made his major junior debut with the Vancouver Giants, his hometown Western Hockey League (WHL) team, playing in one regular-season game and two playoff games. He joined the Giants full-time in 2005–06, scoring 19 points in 62 games. He added seven points in 18 playoff games to help the Giants to a WHL title and an appearance in the 2006 Memorial Cup. In the off-season, he was selected 50th overall by the Boston Bruins in the second round of the 2006 NHL Entry Draft. Bruins management had considered taking Lucic earlier in the second round with the 37th overall pick, but chose defenceman Yuri Alexandrov instead. Bruins Director of Scouting Scott Bradley admitted he did not expect Lucic to still be available with the 50th pick, adding, "We were fortunate to get him."

The following season, in 2006–07, Lucic emerged as one of the Giants' leaders, finishing first in team scoring with 68 points in 70 games.  He added 19 points in 22 post-season games as the Giants lost the WHL Finals to the Medicine Hat Tigers in seven games. Despite losing the WHL title, Vancouver appeared in the 2007 Memorial Cup as tournament hosts. Lucic and the Giants met Medicine Hat once more in the tournament final, capturing the Canadian Hockey League (CHL) title by a 3–1 score. Lucic assisted on Michal Řepík's tournament-winning goal with five minutes to play in regulation. He finished the tournament tied for the lead in scoring with Řepík (with more goals, Řepík was awarded the Ed Chynoweth Trophy as leading scorer) and earned the Stafford Smythe Memorial Trophy as tournament MVP.

Nearly four years after his last junior game, Lucic was honoured by the Giants prior to a game against the Chilliwack Bruins on February 25, 2011. Dubbed "Milan Lucic Night," he was added to the club's Ring of Honour, showcasing the top Giants alumni of all-time. The first 500 game-attendees were also given free Lucic bobblehead dolls. As part of the team's ten-year anniversary, he was also voted by fans as the team's best player of all-time.

Professional

Boston Bruins (2007–2015)

In the 2007 off-season, Lucic signed an entry-level contract with the Bruins on August 2. He had been chosen as the Giants' next team captain, but made the Bruins' 2007–08 opening roster out of training camp. He played in his first career NHL game on October 5, 2007, a 4–1 loss to the Dallas Stars, in which he fought opposing forward Brad Winchester. His first goal came a week later on October 12 against Jonathan Bernier, a game winner, in an 8–6 win against the Los Angeles Kings. By also fighting Kings forward Raitis Ivanāns and notching an assist, he recorded a Gordie Howe hat trick (an unofficial statistic constituting a goal, an assist and a fight in one game). Unsure of whether the Bruins would keep him or return him to junior, he stayed in a downtown hotel in Boston to start the season. However, Lucic made enough of an impression during his first set of games with the Bruins, showing grit and consistent willingness to fight (he recorded 13 fighting majors in his rookie season), that they decided to keep him in the lineup. Bruins management informed the Giants prior to Lucic's tenth game, accounting for the NHL's nine-game maximum for junior-eligible players to stay with their NHL club without initiating their contract. He was chosen to participate in the 2008 NHL YoungStars Game and finished his rookie campaign with eight goals and 27 points. Towards the end of the season, he was voted by Bruins fans for the team's Seventh Player Award for exceeding expectations. Matched up against the first-seeded Montreal Canadiens in the opening round, Lucic scored his first Stanley Cup playoff goal in Game 3 on April 13, 2008.  He finished his first NHL post-season with two goals as the Bruins were eliminated by the Canadiens in seven games.

Early into the 2008–09 season, Lucic recorded his first career NHL hat-trick and added an assist in a 5–4 win against the Atlanta Thrashers on October 25, 2008. Later that week, Lucic made a much-publicized return to his hometown in a game against the Vancouver Canucks, which featured a picture of him as a baby on the back page of Vancouver's The Province newspaper. Earlier in the year, Lucic's 2007 Memorial Cup ring had been stolen from his home in East Vancouver on July 10, 2008. In a private ceremony before the game against the Canucks, he was presented a replacement ring by Vancouver Giants ownership.

Lucic was chosen to his second YoungStars Game in January 2009. However, he did not compete for the sophomores in Montreal due to an undisclosed upper-body injury. Near the end of the season, on April 4, 2009, Lucic was awarded the Bruins' Eddie Shore Award for hustle and determination. He finished his second NHL season improving to 17 goals and 42 points in 72 games, while playing predominantly on a line with the Bruins' top centre, Marc Savard.

Entering the 2009 playoffs with the Bruins as the first seed in the Eastern Conference, Lucic received a one-game suspension after delivering a cross-check to the head of Montreal Canadiens forward Maxim Lapierre in Game 2 of the first round. While the Bruins argued that Lucic used predominantly his glove, rather than his stick, the League held its decision.  After serving his suspension, Lucic and the Bruins went on to eliminate the Canadiens, advancing to the second round against the Carolina Hurricanes, to whom the Bruins lost in seven games. Lucic added nine points in ten games in the playoffs.

With the 2009–10 season marking the final year of his original entry-level contract, it was announced on October 6, 2009, that Lucic had been signed to a three-year, US$12.25 million contract extension with the Bruins through to the 2012–13 season. The deal is structured at US$4 million for the first two seasons and US$4.25 million in the third, a raise from his US$685,000 base salary in 2009–10.  Ten days later, on October 16, he suffered a broken finger requiring surgery in a game against the Dallas Stars while hitting defenceman Stéphane Robidas. Lucic returned to the Bruins lineup on November 19, but was injured again four games later, suffering a sprained ankle in a game against the Minnesota Wild on November 25. His left leg had buckled from underneath him while reaching behind him to receive a pass from teammate Dennis Wideman. Missing an additional 18 games, Lucic was limited to 50 contests in his third NHL season. His play was perceived by Head Coach Claude Julien to have suffered following the two injuries; he recorded nine goals and 20 points to finish the regular season. He added nine points in 13 playoff games as the Bruins were eliminated in the second round by the Philadelphia Flyers. They became the third team in NHL history to lose a playoff series after having led three games to none. All five goals Lucic scored in the playoffs were recorded in the second round, including two in the deciding seventh game, which the Bruins lost 4–3.

In the second month of the 2010–11 season, Lucic recorded a natural hat-trick on November 18, 2010, during a 4–0 win over the Florida Panthers. Later in the campaign, he was fined $3,500 by the NHL for his actions during a game against Atlanta on December 23. After Lucic was hit by opposing defenceman Freddy Meyer, teammate Andrew Ference engaged Meyer in a fight. In the ensuing scrum, Lucic punched Meyer as the two were being restrained by referees, resulting in a match penalty. Three days following the game, Lucic received a $2,500 fine for his punch and an additional $1,000 for an obscene gesture he had made to players on the Thrashers' bench immediately afterwards. In January 2011, he missed three games with a shoulder injury. Lucic completed the season with a career-high 30 goals, 32 assists and 62 points in 79 games. He led the Bruins in goal-scoring while tying for the points lead with centre David Krejčí. Entering the 2011 playoffs as the third seed in the East, the Bruins eliminated the Montreal Canadiens, Philadelphia Flyers and Tampa Bay Lightning in the first three rounds, en route to the Stanley Cup Finals against Vancouver. Although Lucic scored below his regular-season pace during the post-season with 12 points (five goals and seven assists) in 25 games, he helped the Bruins to their first Stanley Cup since 1972, as the team defeated the Canucks in Game 7 of the Finals. It was later reported that Lucic was playing through a couple of injuries during the playoffs. During the Eastern Conference Finals, he suffered a broken toe after blocking a shot from teammate Tyler Seguin during practice. He also struggled with a sinus infection, which was part of a larger problem in his right nostril that traced back to the end of the 2009–10 season and caused improper breathing. Lucic underwent surgery in the off-season to repair the sinus.

In August 2011, Lucic had his customary day in possession of the Stanley Cup, which he spent in Vancouver. While it is traditional for players to host public celebrations with the trophy in their hometowns, Lucic chose to keep the day private, explaining that "I grew up a Canucks fan. I know how it is." Following the Canucks' defeat in the Finals, fans had staged an hours-long riot in Downtown Vancouver. More personally, posters of Lucic at a local cultural community centre were defaced. Also, an appearance by Lucic at a Greek festival in Vancouver sparked a public brawl; The Vancouver Sun reported that Lucic did not throw any punches. While Lucic's day with the Cup was private, many of his functions were held in public venues, which were reportedly well received by passers-by. He brought the trophy to his hometown church, St. Archangel Michael Serbian Orthodox Church in Burnaby, for a gathering of approximately 350 people and on a harbour cruise with friends and family. He finished the day atop Grouse Mountain, the same place where he and his Vancouver Giants teammates took the Memorial Cup after their CHL victory in 2007. Months later, in February 2012, the church he brought the trophy to was vandalized.

A month and a half into the 2011–12 season, Lucic received considerable attention for a hit against opposing goaltender Ryan Miller during a game against the Buffalo Sabres. Miller had come out of his net to play a puck that Lucic last touched midway between the centre line and the Sabres' blue line. As Miller shot the puck towards the end-boards, Lucic collided with him heavily, knocking him to the ice. Miller was diagnosed with a concussion and was sidelined for several games; he also heavily criticized Lucic for his actions and called him a "gutless piece of shit" in post-game comments. The day after the hit, the NHL held a hearing with Lucic and later announced that he would not be suspended for the play, citing that the minor penalty for charging that was assessed during the game was sufficient. A few weeks after this incident, he received a one-game suspension for an illegal hit on Philadelphia forward Zac Rinaldo. Lucic hit Rinaldo from behind during a battle for the puck along the boards, although he was not seriously injured on the play. A short time into the 2013–14 season, Lucic scored his first-ever NHL overtime goal to break a 2–2 tie game at home against the visiting Columbus Blue Jackets.

Los Angeles Kings (2015–2016)
On June 26, 2015, Lucic was traded to the Los Angeles Kings in exchange for goaltender Martin Jones, Colin Miller and the 13th overall pick (used to select Jakub Zbořil) in the 2015 NHL Entry Draft. Lucic excelled during his season with the Kings, playing a strong two-way game while recording 20 goals, 35 assists for 55 points during the regular season. Lucic also added three assists in five games in the 2016 playoffs.

Edmonton Oilers (2016–2019)
As an unrestricted free agent, on the opening day of free agency, Lucic signed a seven-year, $42 million contract with the Edmonton Oilers on July 1, 2016. As his usual #17 is retired by the Oilers for Jari Kurri, he instead chose to wear #27, his number during his junior years.

Lucic enjoyed a successful first year with the Oilers, tallying 23 goals and 50 points to help lead the team to the playoffs for the first time since 2006. The Oilers defeated the San Jose Sharks in six games, but lost to the Anaheim Ducks in seven games. Following his first season in Edmonton, Lucic's production began to dramatically decline. A disappointing second season saw Lucic score just 10 goals and 34 points. This was followed up by scoring just 6 goals and 20 points in his third year with the Oilers, including a goal drought of over 40 games.

Calgary Flames (2019–present)
On July 19, 2019, Lucic waived his no-movement clause and was traded, along with a conditional 2020 third-round draft choice, to the Calgary Flames in exchange for James Neal. Both Neal and Lucic had struggled to live up to the expectations attached to their large salaries on their previous teams and the trade gave both players a chance for a fresh start. Lucic switched back to his familiar #17 with the Flames.

Lucic began his tenure with the Flames on a prolonged goal drought, made more notorious by Neal scoring seven goals (including a four-goal game) in his first seven games with the Oilers. On November 2, 2019, in the midst of his cold streak, Lucic received a 2 game suspension for roughing Kole Sherwood in a game the previous night against the Columbus Blue Jackets. Lucic's slow start, coupled with concerns about his role on the team and lack of playing time, led him to contemplate retirement early in the season.

Finally, in his 28th game of the 2019–20 season, Lucic scored his first goal as a Flame, converting on a pass by Derek Ryan in a 4–3 victory over the Buffalo Sabres. Lucic followed that goal with two more in his next three games. By March, when the season was suspended due to the COVID-19 pandemic, Lucic had eight goals, with only Elias Lindholm, Sean Monahan, and Johnny Gaudreau having recorded more than Lucic's five powerplay goals on the season.

At the time of the Lucic-for-Neal trade, the Flames and Oilers had agreed that, should Neal score at least 21 goals in the 2019–20 NHL season and Lucic score at least 10 fewer goals than Neal, the Oilers would owe the Flames a third-round draft choice in the 2020 NHL Entry Draft. Due to the abrupt and incomplete finish to the 2019–20 season, the Flames and Oilers remained at an impasse over how to resolve the trade condition, given that Neal finished with 19 goals (two fewer than the required threshold) but was on pace to surpass 21 if the season played to its 82-game conclusion. On July 31, 2020, the NHL ruled that the Oilers owed the Flames a third-round draft choice in Edmonton's choice of either the 2020 or 2021 NHL Entry Drafts as a result of a trade condition the two teams had made as part of the Lucic/Neal swap.

On April 13, 2021, Lucic officially played his 1000th game in the National Hockey League. In doing so, he became the 352nd player to reach the 1000 game mark.

International play
In the off-season following Lucic's MVP performance at the 2007 Memorial Cup, he was named team captain of Canada for the 2007 Super Series against Russia.  The series, an eight-game competition between Canada and Russia's under-20 teams, commemorated the 35th anniversary of the historic 1972 Summit Series.  He recorded three assists as Canada won the series with seven wins and a tie.

Two years later, Lucic was invited to Canada's summer orientation camp in Calgary for the 2010 Winter Olympics. He was not, however, chosen to the final roster. Lucic was also invited to the orientation camp for the 2014 Winter Olympics, but again did not make the final roster.

Personal life
Lucic married his longtime girlfriend Brittany Carnegie in the summer of 2012. The couple have three children together, two daughters Valentina and Nikolina, and son Milan Jr.

Career statistics

Regular season and playoffs

International

Awards

Major junior

NHL

*Did not play due to injury

Boston Bruins

Notes

References

External links

 
Milan Lucic's Hockey Canada Profile
Milan Lucic's Twitter

1988 births
Living people
Boston Bruins draft picks
Boston Bruins players
Calgary Flames players
Canadian expatriate ice hockey players in the United States
Canadian ice hockey left wingers
Canadian people of Serbian descent
Coquitlam Express players
Edmonton Oilers players
Los Angeles Kings players
Serb diaspora sportspeople
Stanley Cup champions
Ice hockey people from Vancouver
Vancouver Giants players